Maria Elisabeth Riva (née Sieber; born December 13, 1924) is a German-born American former actress. She worked on television at CBS in the 1950s, becoming one of the first stars of early kinescope-era television. She is the daughter of actress Marlene Dietrich, about whom she published a memoir in 1992.

Life and career

Early life 
Maria Elisabeth Sieber was born in Berlin, the only child of actress Marlene Dietrich and assistant film director Rudolf Sieber (and later Paramount Pictures director of dubbing, Paris, France). In 1930, at age five, she moved with her mother to Los Angeles, California. She spent most of her time at home, on the Paramount Studios lot, and in the company of her mother's friends. In 1934, aged nine, she had a small role in Josef von Sternberg's film The Scarlet Empress, based on the life of Catherine the Great, in which she played Catherine as a child. As no young actress could be found who resembled her mother, she was given the part. In her scenes in the film she was filmed in bed, as she was much older in real life than the character she played. She was also an extra in the 1936 David O. Selznick production, The Garden of Allah.

In order for Dietrich to keep her daughter close to her, Riva was not permitted to attend school; instead she had governesses who saw to her education. Her mother relented in the late 1930s, allowing her to attend Brillantmont International School in Switzerland. During her time at Brillantmont, her roommate was actress Gene Tierney. During her childhood, she would often join the Kennedy family on vacation along with her mother. Despite the six-year age difference between the two, she became good friends with Rosemary Kennedy, saying of their friendship, "Perhaps being two misfits, we felt comfortable in each other's company".

In her biography about her mother, she describes the childhood conditions and effects of a rape at age thirteen by a nanny. She wrote, "In some ways I was trained for rape. Always obedient, always trying to please those in charge of me."

Acting career 

At the age of 15, Riva received acting training at the Max Reinhardt Academy and during the Second World War entertained Allied troops in Europe for the USO from 1945 to 1946, stationed in Frankfurt am Main, Germany. In the early 1940s, she briefly went by the stage name of 'Maria Manton'. She also acted in theatre and summer stock, including a production of Tea and Sympathy. She appeared at the Longacre Theatre on Broadway in the 1954 production The Burning Glass, opposite Cedric Hardwicke and Walter Matthau.

A brief marriage to Dean Goodman—whom she married in 1943—ended in divorce. Then she married scenic designer William Riva in 1947; they had four sons. With the birth of her first child, J. Michael Riva in 1948, the press dubbed Dietrich "the world's most glamorous grandmother". Her second son, Peter Riva, president and owner of International Transactions, Inc., is her literary agent.

In the early years of television, the major television networks of the time tried to build their own stable of actors in the same fashion as the film studios. In 1951, Riva was signed to CBS as a contract player receiving a salary of $250 per week.

Whilst under contract to CBS, Riva not only acted in television productions, but also appeared in commercials, she appeared in television commercials promoting Alcoa, as well as appearing in print advertisements for Rheingold Beer.

During the 1950s, Riva appeared in more than 500 live teleplays for CBS, all broadcast from New York, including The Milton Berle Show, Lux Video Theatre, Hallmark Hall of Fame, Your Show of Shows and Studio One. She received Emmy nominations as best actress in both 1952 and 1953.

In a January 1953 issue of Motion Picture Daily, Riva was named as one of 'Television's Best of 1952' alongside fellow television stars such as Sid Caesar, Lucille Ball, Dinah Shore, Kate Smith and more.

In 1962, having retired from acting, Riva moved to Bern, Switzerland with her husband and four sons, dividing her time between a home in New York purchased for her by her mother in 1948, and their home in Switzerland. Riva then devoted much of the 1960s to organizing her mother's one-woman shows.
Riva appeared as Mrs. Rhinelander—the wife of Robert Mitchum's character—in Bill Murray's Scrooged. In 2001, she was interviewed for Her Own Song, a documentary about her mother. In June 2012, her son Michael died, aged 63, following a stroke.

In 2018, Riva returned to acting, starring in a short-film entitled All Aboard, directed by her grandson J. Michael Riva Jr.

Author 
Riva's biography of her mother, Marlene Dietrich, was published in 1992, the year of Dietrich's death. The book was well-received and went on to become a New York Times Best Seller.

In 2001, Riva co-authored a photography book consisting of unseen images of her mother Marlene Dietrich. In 2005, Riva edited a volume of Dietrich's poetry, Nachtgedanken, which was published in Germany and Italy.

Riva published her first novel, You Were There Before My Eyes: A Novel, in 2017. The novel is about a woman who leaves her Italian village and enters a new world as an immigrant in Detroit.

In 2017, Riva also published the 25th anniversary edition of the biography of her mother, re-titled Marlene Dietrich: The Life.

Later life 
After her mother's death in 1992, Riva sold the bulk of her estate to the city of Berlin to be housed in the then soon-to-be-opening Deutsche Kinemathek for $5 million. The 'Marlene Dietrich Collection' included 100,000 possessions; diaries, books, costumes, traveling trunks and memorabilia. Riva cited her desire to keep the collection together as reason for selling the collection to the city of Berlin to be maintained and displayed in the Deutsche Kinemathek. Riva's son, Peter, said "We chose Berlin, because they are committed to preserving each piece in the collection, which will be part of a new museum complex with the collection as part of its core."

Personal life 
In early 1943, Maria was briefly engaged to actor Richard Haydn, but then married, the same year actor Dean Goodman, of whom she divorced in 1944.  In the summer of 1947, while teaching a graduate course in acting and directing at Fordham University, she met her second husband, scenic designer William Riva. That same year they were wed on Independence Day. They remained happily married for over 50 years until his death in 1999. With him she had four sons. 

Riva maintained friendships with many of her mother's friends and associates, including Brian Aherne, Jean Gabin, Edward R. Murrow, and Yul Brynner, with whom she participated in telethons to benefit United Cerebral Palsy during the 1950s.

As of 2019, Riva lives in Los Angeles, California.

Selected filmography

Stage appearances

Works

References

External links 
 
 
 

Living people
Actresses from Berlin
Actresses from Los Angeles
American film actresses
American child actresses
American stage actresses
American television actresses
Actresses from Palm Springs, California
German emigrants to the United States
1924 births
21st-century American women